Circle of Love is the eleventh studio album by American rock band Steve Miller Band. Released 23 October 1981 by Capitol Records, Circle of Love was the Steve Miller Band's first album of new material since the May 1977 release Book of Dreams. (The band's Greatest Hits 1974–78 compilation disc had been issued in November 1978.) In its original vinyl album format, Circle of Love featured a total of five tracks, Side 2 of the album comprising one extended track, "Macho City" (18:32). A much shorter edit of the track was later used for CD releases.

Although Circle of Love was certified Gold for sales of 500,000 units in December 1981 the album, with its lead single  "Heart Like a Wheel" only managing to reach #24 in the US (and #17 in Canada), was a commercial disappointment in contrast to the band's three preceding albums which had all reached million-selling Platinum status. 

Record World called the title track a "pretty ballad [that] features warm, pinpoint harmony choruses and a unique guitar bridge."

Track listing
All songs written by Steve Miller, except "Get On Home", which is Traditional, arr. Miller.

Early CD and some vinyl versions of the album featured the same tracks with slightly different durations, "Macho City" being shortened to 16:24.

Personnel
 Steve Miller – vocals, guitar
 Byron Allred – keyboards
 Gerald Johnson – bass guitar
 Gary Mallaber – drums, percussion

Additional personnel
 Recording engineer – Rick Fisher
 Art – Stephen Perringer
 Design – John Browning/Ken Trimpe
 Calligraphy – Greg Stadler

References

1981 albums
Steve Miller Band albums
Capitol Records albums